Antoine-Louis-Adolphe Dupuch (1800-1856) was a French Roman Catholic priest. He served as the first-ever Bishop of Algiers from 1838 to 1845 in Algiers, French Algeria. He attempted to evangelise the local Arab population and he built nearly 60 new churches in Algeria.

Early life
Antoine-Adolphe Dupuch was born on May 22, 1800 in Bordeaux, France.

Career
Dupuch was ordained as a priest by the Roman Catholic Archdiocese of Bordeaux in 1825.

Dupuch served as the first Bishop of Algiers from 1838 to 1845. He was initially appointed to cater to the French colonists who lived in Algeria and ensure they led righteous lives. However, Dupuch felt called by God to restore Christianity in Algeria. Indeed, he believed Arabs had been Christians before they were forced to convert to Islam. He also believed Algeria could be used as a springboard to rechristianise the entire continent of Africa.

Dupuch's views on evangelisation clashed with official doctrine of the French Army under Governor-General Thomas Robert Bugeaud, who feared the Arabs might feel disrespected and rebel.  He also clashed with Emily de Vialar and expelled her Sisters of St. Joseph of the Apparition from Algeria; the order focused on evangelising Tunisia instead.

Meanwhile, Dupuch helped build churches across Algeria. By 1846, he had paid for the construction of 60 new churches, chapels and oratories in French Algeria, out of his own pocket. However, he was forced to resign as bishop as he went into debt.

Dupuch was the author of several books about Christianity in French Algeria and Africa. He wrote two books about Abdelkader El Djezairi.

Death
Dupuch died on July 11, 1856.

Works

Further reading

References

1800 births
1856 deaths
Clergy from Bordeaux
French Roman Catholic bishops in Africa
French Roman Catholic writers
Roman Catholic bishops of Algiers